Lahaou Konaté (born 17 November 1991 in Creteil, France) is a French basketball player for Metropolitans 92 of the LNB Pro A and EuroCup. He previously played for French clubs Hyeres-Toulon, Le Mans Sarthe Basket and Nanterre 92, as well as Spanish club Canarias.

On July 19, 2020, Konaté signed a four-year deal with Metropolitans 92.

References

1991 births
Living people
ALM Évreux Basket players
CB Canarias players
French men's basketball players
Le Mans Sarthe Basket players
Liga ACB players
Metropolitans 92 players
Nanterre 92 players
Shooting guards
Sportspeople from Créteil